Sierra Leonean English is the dialect of English spoken by Sierra Leoneans which has been heavily influenced by the Sierra Leone Creole people.

Pronunciation
Sierra Leonean English realises  as a voiced uvular fricative , or, more rarely, a uvular trill . This is rare among accents of English.

See also
 Krio language, an English-based creole language originally spoken by the Sierra Leone Creole people in Sierra Leone and today the country's main lingua franca.

References

Bibliography

 
 

Dialects of English
Languages of Sierra Leone
Sierra Leone Creole people